Kent Glacier is a glacier which drains the east side of Markham Plateau in the Queen Elizabeth Range of Antarctica, and flows east for about  to enter Lowery Glacier. It was named by the northern party of the New Zealand Geological Survey Antarctic Expedition (1961–62) after the English county and the Dukedom of Kent.

References

Glaciers of the Ross Dependency
Shackleton Coast